Tailed sulphur may refer to:

 Dercas verhuelli, a butterfly endemic to Indochina
 Phoebis neocypris, a butterfly found in Central and South America

Animal common name disambiguation pages